John Max Henry Scawen Wyndham, 7th Baron Leconfield, 2nd Baron Egremont, FRSL, DL (born 21 April 1948), generally known as Max Egremont, is a British biographer and novelist. Egremont is the eldest son of John Wyndham, 6th Baron Leconfield and 1st Baron Egremont, and Pamela Wyndham-Quin, and succeeded his father in 1972. He is a direct descendant of Sir John Wyndham. He married Caroline Nelson, a garden designer, in 1978 and they have four children, three daughters and a son. He lives at the family seat of Petworth House in Sussex, which his family gave to the National Trust in 1947.

Early life 
Egremont grew up in Petworth in West Sussex. He was educated first at Heatherdown School near Ascot, then at Eton College and at Christ Church, Oxford, where he read modern history.

Career 
He has worked for the American publishing firm Crowell Collier Macmillan and on the staff of U.S. Senator Hugh Scott in Washington. After his father's death in 1972, Egremont moved to Petworth and became the 2nd Baron Egremont and 7th Baron Leconfield.

Writing 
Egremont's first book The Cousins: The Friendship, Opinions and Activities of Wilfrid Scawen Blunt and George Wyndham was published in 1977 and won the Yorkshire Post Prize for the best first book of that year. His next work was Balfour: A Life of Arthur James Balfour, published in 1980. He then wrote four novels, The Ladies' Man (1983), Dear Shadows (1986), Painted Lives (1989) and Second Spring (1993). His biography of Major General Sir Edward Spears, Under Two Flags, was published in 1997 and was short listed for the Westminster Medal for Military History. He was appointed to be the official biographer of Siegfried Sassoon by Sassoon's son George. Egremont's Siegfried Sassoon came out in 2005 and was short listed for the James Tait Black Memorial Prize. In 2011 he published Forgotten Land, Journeys Among the Ghosts of East Prussia. In 2014, he published Some Desperate Glory, the First World War the Poets Knew. In 2017 Egremont was joint author with Frances Carey of Käthe Kollwitz, Portrait of the Artist, the catalogue that accompanied a travelling exhibition of Kollwitz's work. He was elected a Fellow of the Royal Society of Literature in 2001. Egremont's short book The Connel Guide to World War 1 was published in 2017.

Other interests 
He was a trustee of the Wallace Collection from 1988 to 2000, of the British Museum from 1990 to 2000, and a member of the Royal Commission on Historical Manuscripts from 1989 to 2001. He has been chairman of the Friends of the National Libraries since 1985 and of the National Manuscripts Conservation Trust since 1995. He is President of the Sussex Heritage Trust and of the Sussex branch of the Council for the Protection of Rural England.

Books 
 The Cousins (William Collins 1977)
 Balfour (William Collins1980)
 The Ladies’ Man (Secker & Warburg 1983)
 Dear Shadows (Secker & Warburg 1986)
 Painted Lives (Hamish Hamilton 1989)
 Second Spring (Hamish Hamilton 1993)
 Under Two Flags (Weidenfeld & Nicolson 1997)
 Siegfried Sassoon: A Poet and His Library (Grolier Club 2002)
 Siegfried Sassoon (Picador 2005)
 Forgotten Land: Journeys Among the Ghosts of East Prussia (Picador 2011)
 Some Desperate Glory: The First World War the Poets Knew (Picador 2014)
 Käthe Kollwitz, with Frances Carey (British Museum 2018)
 All You Need to Know About World War 1 (Connel 2018)
The Glass Wall: Lives on the Baltic Frontier (Farrar, Straus and Giroux 2021)

References

External links
Google book search list of books by Max Egremont Retrieved 2009-07-03

1948 births
Living people
People educated at Eton College
Alumni of Christ Church, Oxford
English biographers
Barons in the Peerage of the United Kingdom
Eldest sons of British hereditary barons
Fellows of the Royal Society of Literature
Deputy Lieutenants of West Sussex
Max
Leconfield